Duet for Four is a 1982 film directed by Tim Burstall.

Plot
A middle aged man, Ray Martin, faces a series of problems – his wife is cheating on him, his mistress wants to get married and Americans want to take over his toy business.

Cast
Mike Preston as Ray Martin
Wendy Hughes as Barbara Dunstan
Michael Pate as Al Geisman
Diane Cilento as Margot Martin
Gary Day as Terry Byrne
Vanessa Leigh as Dianne Sanders
Warwick Comber as Cliff Ingersoll
Sigrid Thornton as Carline Martin
Clare Binney as Jacki Nesbitt

Production
The script by David Williamson was originally commissioned by Hexagon Productions in the wake of the success of Petersen (1974). Tim Burstall asked Williamson to write a script on a mid life crisis even though he was young at the time. Williamson wrote the script in eight days under the title The Toy Man but Hexagon decided not to make it, even though at one stage it was announced as a vehicle for Jack Thompson.

In the 1980s Williamson's reputation remained high and Burstall decided to make it. Burstall:
I was going through a mid-life crisis of some sort and thought – 'What is the nature of work? Have I wasted my time? Am I doing the right thing?' That sort of thing. And toys was the industry we decided to use because it was being taken over by the Yanks. It was a sort of image of what was happening in film at the time. I don't think the picture works very well.
The title during shooting was Partners. The film was shot in Melbourne and Queenscliff. According to David Stratton the movie features some in jokes about the Australian film industry of the early 1970s.

Finance was partly provided by the Australian Film Commission and Victorian Film Corporation.

Wendy Hughes later described making the film as "one of my most enjoyable experiences" but thought "the role I was playing... seemed more a part of the early 1970s, when in fact it was written".

References

External links

Duet for Four at Oz Movies

Australian drama films
Films directed by Tim Burstall
1982 films
1980s English-language films
1980s Australian films